Morston (1970–1993) was a French-bred, British-trained Thoroughbred racehorse. He is best known for winning the 1973 Derby on his second racecourse appearance. He was then injured, and retired undefeated.

Background
Morston was bred in France by his owner Arthur Budgett's Park Farm Stud. He was sired by the Irish Derby winner Ragusa out of Budgett's mare Windmill Girl. This made him a brother of the 1969 Derby winner Blakeney. He was named after a village in Norfolk.

Racing career
Unraced at two, Morston made his debut in the Godstone Plate, at Lingfield in May 1973. He won comfortably, but showed his inexperience. According to Budgett, the horse was "all over the place".

In the Derby Morston was made a 25-1 outsider. His jockey Edward Hide was instructed by Budgett not to be too hard on the colt, if he was not in a winning position. In the race he hit the front a furlong out and stayed on well to beat Cavo Doro by half a length.

Morston was being trained for the Great Voltigeur Stakes when he suffered a tendon injury which ended his career.

Assessment
Morston has been regarded as one of the least distinguished Derby winners. Writing in the Racing Post, John Randall rated him the worst Derby winner since the Second World War. Budgett, however, regarded Morston as superior to his other Derby winner Blakeney, and the best horse he had ever trained.

He was rated 125 by Timeform.

Stud career
Morston had modest success as a stallion. His best runners were probably Whitstead (Great Voltigeur Stakes), Morcon (Prince of Wales's Stakes) and More Light (Jockey Club Stakes).

Pedigree

References

1970 racehorse births
1993 racehorse deaths
Racehorses bred in France
Racehorses trained in the United Kingdom
Undefeated racehorses
Epsom Derby winners
Thoroughbred family 20-c